Arturo López (born 20 May 1935) is a Bolivian former footballer who played as a goalkeeper. He played in 20 matches for the Bolivia national football team between 1957 and 1965. He was also part of Bolivia's squad that won the 1963 South American Championship.

References

External links
 

1935 births
Living people
Bolivian footballers
Bolivia international footballers
Place of birth missing (living people)
Association football goalkeepers